Peter Libby is an American physician, focusing in atherosclerosis, cardiology and preventive cardiology, currently the Mallinckrodt Professor of Medicine, Harvard Medical School at Brigham and Women's Hospital.

Personal life
Libby was married to Beryl Benacerraf.

References

Year of birth missing (living people)
Living people
Harvard Medical School faculty
American cardiologists
University of California, San Diego alumni